The 1968 WANFL season was the 84th season of senior football in Perth, Western Australia. It saw Perth, after having won only two premierships in its first sixty-six seasons, win its third consecutive flag under captain-coach Mal Atwell and champion rover Barry Cable – all three Grand Finals having been won against East Perth with Cable taking the Simpson Medal.

Among numerous highlights, champion Subiaco full-forward Austin "Ocker" Robertson broke by one goal the 1953 record of Bernie Naylor for the most goals in a WANFL home-and-away season, doing so with a whopping twenty-six scoring shots against East Fremantle in the final round. Perth achieved the best record for a full season since South Fremantle's champion 1953 team with only two losses – which Barry Cable missed due to a broken hand and then interstate duties – whilst West Perth, under former East Perth champion “Polly” Farmer as captain-coach lost only three home-and-away matches to equal the Cardinals’ 1953 record. East Perth were to have a slow start and were in danger of missing the finals until July, but three last-kick wins – the last two after surrendering big leads – took the Royals to the Grand Final.

In contrast, Swan Districts – who had at the beginning of the decade risen from a long period as a chopping block to a hat-trick of premierships – fell to become the first WANFL team to win only one match in a season since they themselves did so in 1951, owing to extreme weakness in the ruck where expected top follower  Dave Dalgarno moved to QAFL club Western Districts under an ANFC coaching scheme without playing a league match, major injuries to key players Ken Bagley, John Turnbull and Peter Manning, and the retirement of numerous key players of between 1961 and 1965. The Swans introduced an incentive scheme of paying players a $15 match fee for a win instead of the standard $5 after twelve rounds, but this had little effect. Their solitary win, by one point with a kick after the siren, made Swans the closest club to a winless season in open-age WA(N)FL competition between 1918 and 1998. East Fremantle, after falling to seventh in 1967, had their worst season since the club's first year in 1898, in the process setting a still-standing club record of thirteen consecutive defeats, whilst Subiaco, coached by Haydn Bunton Jr., rose from last to fourth aided by Robertson's prolific goalkicking. However, in the most uneven season in a major Australian Rules league, they won all 12 games against the four teams that missed the finals, but lost all 9 matches against the three Perth clubs that finished above them on the ladder.  That pattern would continue into the finals, where they lost the first semi final to East Perth.

Home-and-away season

Round 1

Round 2

Round 3

Round 4

Round 5

Round 6

Round 7

Round 8

Round 9

Round 10

Round 11

Round 12

Round 13

Interstate match

Round 14

Round 15

Round 16

Round 17

Round 18

Round 19

Round 20

Round 21

Ladder

Finals

First semi-final

Second semi-final

Preliminary final

Grand Final

Notes
In terms of Noll-Scully index of competitive balance the 1968 WANFL season's figure of 2.5912 is the highest ever observed in any of the VFL/AFL, SANFL or WA(N)FL.The only greater monopolisation of a team's goals for a score with fifteen or more goals in a major Australian Rules league is by Ted Tyson for West Perth against Swan Districts in the final round of 1938, when he kicked 17.5 (107) out of the Cardinals’ 18.7 (115).

References

External links
Official WAFL website
Western Australian National Football League (WANFL), 1968

West Australian Football League seasons
WANFL